Eutingen is a municipality in the district of Freudenstadt in Baden-Württemberg in southern Germany.

Notable people 
 Olaf Saile (1901–1952), was a German writer

References 

Freudenstadt (district)
Populated places on the Neckar basin
Populated riverside places in Germany